Anthony Shaffer may refer to:

 Anthony Shaffer (writer), English playwright, novelist, and screenwriter
 Anthony Shaffer (intelligence officer), U.S. Army intelligence officer and memoirist

See also
Shaffer
Tony Shafer